Clifton Park Center Baptist Church and Cemetery is a historic Baptist church and cemetery at 713 Clifton Park Center Road in Clifton Park Center, Saratoga County, New York.  It was built in 1837 and is a rectangular, gable-roofed brick church in a vernacular Greek Revival style.  The adjacent cemetery is surrounded by a cast and wrought iron picket fence and gate.  There are approximately 350 burials.  The congregation was established about 1794 and the cemetery about 1801.

It was listed on the National Register of Historic Places in 2004.

References

External links
Clifton Park Center Baptist Church website

Baptist cemeteries in the United States
Baptist churches in New York (state)
Churches on the National Register of Historic Places in New York (state)
Greek Revival church buildings in New York (state)
Churches completed in 1837
19th-century Baptist churches in the United States
Churches in Saratoga County, New York
National Register of Historic Places in Saratoga County, New York